Masahiko (written: 正彦, 雅彦, 誠彦, 昌彦, 允彦, 政彦, 真彦, 正比古 or まさ彦) is a masculine Japanese given name. Notable people with the name include:

, an officer in the Imperial Japanese Army imprisoned for his involvement in the Amakasu Incident
, a Japanese mathematician best known as an essayist
, a Japanese ski jumper
, a Japanese footballer
, a Japanese football player
, a Japanese politician of the Liberal Democratic Party
, a Japanese columnist, photographer, and pundit
, a Japanese judoka (Judo practitioner)
, a bonsai master
, a chef specializing in Italian cuisine
, or Matchy is a Japanese singer, lyricist and actor
, a Japanese former football player
, a Japanese anime producer and president of Bones
, a linguistics professor at San Francisco State University
, Japanese baseball player
, a Japanese Magic: The Gathering player
, a Japanese film director
, a former Japanese football player
, a manga artist from Kōchi City, Japan
, a Japanese theatre and film actor
, a Japanese journalist who advocated Takeji Furukawa's idea
, a Japanese politician of the Liberal Democratic Party
, a Japanese writer
, Japanese kickboxer
, the head of the domestic affairs section of the Military Affairs Bureau of the Imperial Japanese Army during World War II
, Japanese voice actor
, Japanese jazz percussionist and composer
, Japanese rugby union player
, a Japanese actor and director
, Japanese shogi player
, a Japanese politician of the Democratic Party of Japan
, Japanese speed skater
, a Japanese guitarist

Japanese masculine given names